Voznice is a municipality and village in Příbram District in the Central Bohemian Region of the Czech Republic. It has about 700 inhabitants.

Administrative parts
The village of Chouzavá is an administrative part of Voznice.

Geography
The eastern part of the municipality lies in the Benešov Uplands, the western part lies in the Brdy Highlands. The village is surrounded on all sides by woods.

History
The first written mention of Voznice is from 1788. The village was founded by the House of Mansfeld, who owned the Dobříš estate, to which it belonged. In the interwar period of the 20th century, Voznice was a popular place for the recreation of prominent people from Prague.

Transport
The D4 motorway runs along the western municipal border.

References

External links

Villages in Příbram District